Adolfas Aleksejūnas (born 27 June 1937) is a Lithuanian middle-distance runner. He competed in the men's 3000 metres steeplechase at the 1964 Summer Olympics, representing the Soviet Union.

References

External links

1937 births
Living people
Athletes (track and field) at the 1964 Summer Olympics
Lithuanian male middle-distance runners
Lithuanian male steeplechase runners
Soviet male middle-distance runners
Soviet male steeplechase runners
Olympic athletes of the Soviet Union